The 12M is a bus chassis range manufactured by Indian vehicle manufacturer Ashok Leyland. The "12M" denotes the chassis length which is 11.7 meters. This chassis is primarily aimed at Inter state bus operators has a good presence in Indian roads. The front engine rear wheel driven bus was introduced in 2000s. Currently this chassis is provided with diesel engine only. The chassis has various options like air conditioner, retarder, full air suspension, automated transmission.

BS II 
All the engines were turbo charged and inter-cooled. All variants had 6 speed synchromesh gearbox with overdrive and radial tyres except the  variant which had 5 Speed synchromesh gearbox and cross-ply tyres. The top end  chassis provided with optional air conditioning, retarder and air suspension.

 ALPSV 4/106
 ALPSV 4/107
 ALPSV 4/114
 ALPSV 4/86

BS III 
The 225 hp variant ALPSV 4/225, was the early bus chassis apart from Volvo buses, to offer common rail diesel engines in BS III platform. The buses also featured 'H' Series engines. The 165 engine came with inline fuel injection pump (FIP) while 180 hp version had electronic diesel control (EDC). All variants came with 6 speed synchromesh overdrive gearbox and optional anti braking system (ABS). The 225 hp engine variant had electromagnetic retarder with an optional Leymatic automated manual transmission.

 ALPSV 4/157
 ALPSV 4/160
 ALPSV 4/169
 ALPSR 3/33 Rear Engine

BS IV 
In BS IV lineup all engines featured common rail with the addition of SCR and i-EGR to meet BS IV norms. The low end 165 hp engine featured Ashok Leyland's indigenous i-EGR while 177 hp, 221 hp had SCR. ABS become a standard fitment. Tyre can be chosen between radials and tubeless radials.

References 

Bus chassis
 
Bus transport in India